Hidalgo is a city in Hidalgo County, Texas, United States. The population was 11,198 at the 2010 census, and in 2019 the estimated population was 14,183.

History

The area that is now Hidalgo was first settled by Spanish colonists led by José de Escandón circa 1749. The colony was known by multiple names: La Habitación, Rancho San Luis, and San Luisito. In 1852, John Young settled in the area and renamed the town "Edinburgh" after his place of birth, Edinburgh, Scotland; Edinburgh became the county seat of Hidalgo County. The town was incorporated in 1876, and its name was changed to "Hidalgo" in 1885.

Geography

Hidalgo is located in southern Hidalgo County at  (26.104473, –98.246443). It is located across the Rio Grande (Rio Bravo del Norte) from the Mexican city of Reynosa, Tamaulipas.

One of the southern termini of U.S. Route 281 is at the border crossing in Hidalgo. The highway leads east then north  to Pharr, or southeast  to Brownsville. Texas State Highway 115 runs north from Hidalgo  to McAllen, the largest city in Hidalgo County.

Demographics

2020 census

As of the 2020 United States census, there were 13,964 people, 3,774 households, and 3,220 families residing in the city.

2000 census
As of the census of 2000, there were 7,322 people, 1,747 households, and 1,593 families residing in the city. The population density was 1,682.2 people per square mile (649.9/km). There were 1,880 housing units at an average density of 431.9 per square mile (166.9/km). The racial makeup of the city was 82.12% White, 0.12% African American, 0.29% Native American, 0.12% Asian, 15.45% from other races, and 1.90% from two or more races. Hispanic or Latino of any race were 97.75% of the population.

There were 1,747 households, out of which 61.9% had children under the age of 18 living with them, 66.1% were married couples living together, 21.0% had a female householder with no husband present, and 8.8% were non-families. 8.1% of all households were made up of individuals, and 4.7% had someone living alone who was 65 years of age or older. The average household size was 4.19 and the average family size was 4.43.

In the city, the population was spread out, with 39.0% under the age of 18, 11.6% from 18 to 24, 28.0% from 25 to 44, 14.7% from 45 to 64, and 6.6% who were 65 years of age or older. The median age was 25 years. For every 100 females, there were 88.6 males. For every 100 females age 18 and over, there were 82.4 males.

The median income for a household in the city was $19,469, and the median income for a family was $20,357. Males had a median income of $16,238 versus $13,577 for females. The per capita income for the city was $5,849. About 41.4% of families and 44.3% of the population were below the poverty line, including 51.2% of those under age 18 and 45.5% of those age 65 or over.

Government and infrastructure
The United States Postal Service operates the Hidalgo Post Office.

Education
Hidalgo Independent School District and Valley View Independent School District serve sections of the city.

The portion in Hidalgo ISD is divided between the zones of Hidalgo Elementary School and Salinas Elementary School. All residents of the Hidalgo ISD area are zoned to Ida Diaz Jr. High School, and Hidalgo Early College High School.

In addition, South Texas Independent School District operates magnet schools that serve the community.

The Hidalgo Public Library serves Hidalgo. The library, designed by Hidalgo native Eduardo Vela, opened on April 8, 1998.

Sports
Hidalgo used to be the home to the  Rio Grande Valley Vipers of the NBA G League, who played in the local Payne Arena, and the Rio Grande Valley FC Toros of the USL Championship, who play in the H-E-B Park. Former teams include the Rio Grande Valley Magic of the Southern Indoor Football League, the Rio Grande Valley Killer Bees of the Central Hockey League and North American Hockey League, La Fiera FC of the Professional Arena Soccer League and the Rio Grande Valley Sol of the Lone Star Football League and X-League Indoor Football. The Payne Arena is also a concert venue serving the McAllen–Edinburg–Mission and Reynosa–McAllen metropolitan areas.

References

External links

 City of Hidalgo official website
 Hidalgo, Tx (Hidalgo County) in Handbook of Texas Online

Cities in Hidalgo County, Texas
Mexico–United States border crossings
Lower Rio Grande Valley
Former county seats in Texas
Cities in Texas